Mian Gavaber may refer to:
 Mian Gavaber, Lahijan
 Mian Gavaber, Langarud